Sinead Lohan (born 10 February 1995) is an Irish tennis player.

Lohan has won two ITF singles titles in her career, and has achieved a career-high singles ranking of 748 in October 2017. She made her debut for the Ireland Fed Cup team in 2011, and has a win–loss record of 10–5.

Lohan is currently a student at the University of Miami, where she is an NCAA collegiate player, and is set to graduate in 2018. She ended the 2016 season ranked 8th best collegiate player in the US.

ITF Circuit finals

Singles: 3 (2 titles, 1 runner-up)

External links
 
 
 

1995 births
Living people
Irish female tennis players
Miami Hurricanes women's tennis players